Cimaria vargasi is a species of sea snail, a marine gastropod mollusk in the family Pyramidellidae, the pyrams and their allies. This is the only species assigned to the genus Cimaria.

Distribution
This species is mainly distributed throughout the Pacific Ocean off the coasts of Florida, New Jersey and New York.

References

External links
 To World Register of Marine Species

Pyramidellidae
Gastropods described in 2012